The Antarctic Conservation Act, enacted in 1978 by the 95th United States Congress, and amended by , is a United States federal law that addresses the issue of environmental conservation on the continent of Antarctica. The Departments of the Treasury, Interior and Commerce are responsible for the Act's enforcement.

Purpose
Until the 1960s, few rules existed regarding activities in Antarctica.  Fishing, whaling and sealing were uncontrolled, and various species were threatened with extinction.  Tourists and research stations littered and polluted.  In 1961 the Antarctic Treaty was established to protect the continent, and establishes major restrictions and responsibilities on visitors and uses. 

As part of its responsibilities as a signatory to the Antarctic Treaty, the United States passed the Antarctic Conservation Act of 1978 to establish rules for all U.S. citizens, U.S. corporations, and certain persons who participate in U.S. government expeditions visiting or operating in Antarctica, as well as U.S. citizens who handle certain Antarctic animals and plants, and other persons handling Antarctic animals and plants while in the U.S.

The act makes it:
“(…) unlawful, unless authorized by permit, to:
take native mammals or birds
enter specially designated areas
introduce nonindigenous species to Antarctica
use or discharge designated pollutants
discharge wastes
import certain antarctic items into the United States”

See also
 Agreed Measures for the Conservation of Antarctic Fauna and Flora

References

External links
Summary from Federal Wildlife Laws Handbook
Antarctic Conservation Act  National Science Foundation

1978 in law
1978 in international relations
United States federal environmental legislation
Antarctica agreements
Environment of Antarctica
1978 in the environment